The Civil Air Patrol's Idaho Wing (Abbreviated IDWG) is the highest echelon of Civil Air Patrol in the state of Idaho. Idaho Wing headquarters are located in Blackfoot, Idaho. Idaho Wing oversees 9 squadrons and over 400 cadets and senior members across the state of Idaho

Mission
Civil Air Patrol has three missions: providing emergency services; offering cadet programs for youth; and providing aerospace education for both CAP members and the general public.

Emergency Services
Civil Air Patrol provides emergency services, including search and rescue missions, disaster relief operations, humanitarian services, Air Force support missions, and counter-drug operations.

In March 2020, volunteers from the Idaho Wing were activated to support the Kootenai County Emergency Operations Center during the COVID-19 pandemic. Members performed administrative functions in support of the county, including helping the operations center obtain FEMA reimbursements.

Cadet Programs
Civil Air Patrol provides a cadet program for youth aged 12 to 21. Cadets train through the 16-step program in skills including aerospace education, leadership training, physical fitness, and moral leadership.

Aerospace Education
Civil Air Patrol provides both internal training for CAP members, and external training for the general public. Internal training is directed at both senior members and cadets. External training through the public is provided through the nation's educational system through workshops provided to students.

Command Staff and Chain of Command 
The Current Commander of Idaho Wing is Colonel Robin Vest, the Vice Commander is Lieutenant Colonel Kirk Dehn and the Command Non-Commissioned Officer (NCO) is Master Sergeant (MSgt) Gerald Martin They were preceded by Colonel Robert Bost who served as Commander of Idaho Wing from 2018 to 2021.

Organization

See also 
Awards and decorations of Civil Air Patrol
Idaho Air National Guard

References

External links
Idaho Wing Civil Air Patrol official website

Wings of the Civil Air Patrol
Education in Idaho
Military in Idaho